Deutsch Evangelische St. Paul's Kirche is a historic Evangelical Protestant church located at Santa Claus, Spencer County, Indiana. It was built in 1880, and is a one-story, wood-frame building sheathed in clapboard siding.  It sits on a sandstone block foundation and has a gable roof.  It features a square bell tower with steeple measuring 70 feet tall. The building was moved to Santa Claus Park in 2012.

It was listed on the National Register of Historic Places in 1984 and delisted in 2012.

References

External links
History of Santa Claus Park

Former National Register of Historic Places in Indiana
Evangelical churches in Indiana
Churches on the National Register of Historic Places in Indiana
Churches completed in 1880
Buildings and structures in Spencer County, Indiana
National Register of Historic Places in Spencer County, Indiana